10,000 Reasons may refer to:

10,000 Reasons (album), 2013 Christian album by Matt Redman
10,000 Reasons (book), 2016 book by Matt Redman
"10,000 Reasons (Bless the Lord)", 2011 song co-written in by Matt Redman and Jonas Myrin